Simon Burton may refer to:
 Simon Burton (physician), English physician
 Simon Burton (artist), English painter
 Simon Burton (parliamentary official), British public servant

See also
 Simon Burton-Jones, British Anglican bishop